Petrikov or Petříkov may refer to:

Places
 Petříkov (České Budějovice District)
 Petříkov (Ostružná), a village and ski resort in the Jeseník Mountains of the Czech Republic
 Petříkov (Prague-East District)
 Pietrykaŭ, town in (Belarus)

People
, Russian racer
Pavel Petřikov (Czech judoka born 1959)
Pavel Petřikov (Czech judoka born 1986)

Alexi Petrikov, fictional character from Woman of the Year (musical)
 Simon Petrikov, the Ice King, a fictional character from Adventure Time

Other
 A Dutch brand of vodka